Antonio Cervantes (born December 23, 1945) is a Colombian boxing trainer and former professional boxer who competed from 1961 to 1983. He held the WBA and The Ring light welterweight title twice between 1972 and 1980. 

In 2002, Cervantes was chosen for the Ring Magazine's list of 80 Best Fighters of the Last 80 Years. Boxrec also ranked him the 50th greatest pound for pound boxer of all time.

Personal life
Cervantes, who is Afro-Colombian, was born in Palenque, also known as the first site of a slave rebellion in the Americas. Cervantes used to sell contraband cigarettes and shine shoes as a child to survive.

Professional boxing career
He met boxing trainer Carmelo Prada, who helped shape his style. Cervantes only had three amateur bouts, winning two and losing one. On January 31, 1964, Cervantes entered the boxing ring as a professional for the first time, beating Juan Martínez by decision in six rounds. His first 32 bouts as a professional were in Colombia, and he won 27, lost 4 and drew one of them. Realizing his pupil needed publicity outside Colombia, Prada then moved with Cervantes to Venezuela, where, on November 25, 1968, he knocked out Orlando Ruiz in the first round for his first fight abroad. He followed that win with a ten rounds decision over Nestor Rojas in the very short time of only three days later.

On December 23 of that year, he suffered his first knockout defeat when Cruz Marcano, a fringe contender of the time, beat him in four rounds in Caracas.

He won five and lost two in 1969, splitting his fights between Colombia and Venezuela, and losing a ten-round decision to Antonio Gómez, former world champion.

He won two more in 1970, then he and Prada moved, this time to Los Angeles. In California, he began by beating Jose Rodriguez by a knockout in the first round in San Jose, and on December 17, he beat Rodolfo Gato González, a very famous Mexican boxer of the time, by knockout in round eight. After this and a 1971 win over Argentine Enrique Jana, Cervantes was ranked as a light welterweight by the WBA. On December 11 of that year, he had his first world title try, against Nicolino Locche, in Buenos Aires. Cervantes lost a 15-round decision that time, however.

Winning the light welterweight title
After winning three fights in 1972, Cervantes, who had by then returned to Colombia, had another world title try: Alfonso Frazer, who had dethroned Locche of the world title, gave Cervantes a chance on October 28 at Panama City. Cervantes knocked Frazer out in round ten and became the world light welterweight champion for the first time.

Cervantes immediately became a national hero in Colombia, and many enterprises made him their spokesman in the coffee producing country, most notably Sanyo, whose name the popular champion advertised on his clothing and fight trunks.

Cervantes made nine defenses, including a TKO in round ten against Locche in their rematch after his corner stopped the fight due to a cut over his left eye, a knockout in five of Frazer, also in a rematch, a 15-round split decision win over Josue Marquez in Puerto Rico (in the first world title bout ever held at Roberto Clemente Coliseum; most of the nine thousand in attendance scored the fight for Cervantes) and a 15-round decision against future world Lightweight champion Esteban De Jesús. But on March 6, 1976, at San Juan, he lost a 15-round decision and the world title to 17-year-old Puerto Rican Wilfred Benítez, who with that became boxing's youngest champion ever.

Cervantes won five more fights in a row, including a win over Saoul Mamby, before fighting for the world title again. After Benitez had left the light welterweight belt vacant, Cervantes regained it on June 25, 1977, with a five-round knockout over Carlos Maria Gimenez, again in Venezuela. His second reign as world champion took him to such places as Thailand, Botswana and South Korea, among others. He retained the title six times, beating the likes of Adrian Marrero and Miguel Montilla (twice). By this time, there was much talk about a superfight with world Lightweight champion Roberto Durán, who was coming up in weight. Duran decided to challenge Sugar Ray Leonard instead, however, and Cervantes vs. Duran never materialized.

On August 2, 1980, Cervantes dropped his next title challenger, Aaron Pryor, to the canvas in the first round. Pryor recovered, however, and beat Cervantes by a knockout in round four. This turned out to be Cervantes' last world title fight. He fought two times more for the FECARBOX WBC title, winning both fights shortly before retiring in 1980.

However, Cervantes came out of retirement due to financial problems and went on boxing until 1983, winning four fights and dropping his last one, a ten-round decision loss to Danny Sanchez on December 9, 1983, at Miami.

Retirement
In retirement, his life was almost as public as it was during his boxing career: In 1985, for example, he and a female passenger in one of the boats Cervantes owned, suffered a water accident, and the passenger almost drowned, but Cervantes was able to save her life. A movie has been made about a fictional boxer called Milton Ollivera (who comes from Colombia) who goes through a majority of the things Cervantes went through throughout his life.

Cervantes was inducted into the International Boxing Hall of Fame in 1998, and in 2000, he was declared by the Colombian Boxing Federation and National Association of Professional Boxing as Colombia's Fighter of the Century. For that award, the WBA issued him a special, commemorative belt.

Cervantes' nickname, Kid Pambelé, became almost as famous as Cervantes himself: as a matter of a fact, many fans called him only Pambelé or Pambe (the name of a song by Carlos Vives about him).

Professional boxing record

o

See also
List of light welterweight boxing champions
List of WBA world champions

References

External links
International Boxing Hall of Fame Bio
 
Antonio Cervantes - CBZ Profile

|-

|-

|-

|-

1945 births
Living people
International Boxing Hall of Fame inductees
Light-welterweight boxers
World boxing champions
People from Bolívar Department
Colombian male boxers
Colombian people of African descent
20th-century Colombian people